Eugene Souleiman is a London-born British hairstylist. He has created hair for Lady Gaga and has done numerous designs for well-known fashion companies. In 1995 he began his career with Jil Sander and by 2003 joined the brothers Jake and Dinos Chapman to create a chess set at the Saatchi Gallery.

He currently lives in England with his wife and two daughters.

References

Living people
20th-century births
British hairdressers
Year of birth missing (living people)